Chong-Aryk is an urban-type settlement in northern Kyrgyzstan. Its population was 10,317 in 2021. The town is administratively subordinated to the Lenin District within the city of Bishkek. The town is home to the Ala Archa State Residence.

Population

References

Populated places in Bishkek